Benjamin Gomel (born 14 May 1998) is a French professional footballer who plays as a forward for  club Sedan.

Career
Gomel made his professional debut for Lens in a 1–1 Ligue 2 tie against Lorient on 3 February 2018. After three loans, he signed for Red Star, in the Championnat National.

In October 2021, Gomel returned to Boulogne. In June 2022, he signed for Sedan.

References

External links
 
 
 

1998 births
Living people
Association football forwards
People from Boulogne-sur-Mer
French footballers
Ligue 2 players
Championnat National players
Championnat National 2 players
Championnat National 3 players
RC Lens players
US Boulogne players
JA Drancy players
SO Cholet players
Red Star F.C. players
CS Sedan Ardennes players
Sportspeople from Pas-de-Calais